Maria Adelaide Aglietta (4 June 1940 – 20 May 2000) was an Italian politician, deputy for the Radical Party between 1979 and 1985 (when she resigned) and 1987 to 1989. She was also a Member of the European Parliament from 1989 to 1999. Between 1 November 1990 and 18 July 1994 she was head of the  Greens parliamentary group in the European Parliament.

Aglietta was born in Turin.

References

External links
Maria Adelaide Aglietta at the European Parliament

1940 births
2000 deaths
Nobility from Turin
Radical Party (Italy) politicians
Rainbow Greens politicians
Deputies of Legislature VII of Italy
Deputies of Legislature VIII of Italy
Deputies of Legislature IX of Italy
Deputies of Legislature X of Italy
20th-century women MEPs for Italy
Rainbow Greens MEPs
Federation of the Greens MEPs
MEPs for Italy 1989–1994
MEPs for Italy 1994–1999
20th-century Italian women politicians
Women members of the Chamber of Deputies (Italy)